John West  was an Irish Anglican priest. He was Dean of St Patrick’s Cathedral, Dublin in the Church of Ireland from 1864 to 1889.

Educated at Trinity College, Dublin, he was ordained in 1830 and began his ordained ministry career as curate at Monkstown, County Dublin. He was the incumbent at St Ann's Dublin, and then archdeacon of the city before his appointment to the eanery, a post he held for 25 years. He died on 5 July 1890.

His son Charles Dickinson West became an engineer and naval architect.

References

1806 births
Alumni of Trinity College Dublin
Irish Anglicans
Archdeacons of Dublin
Deans of St. Patrick's Cathedral, Dublin
1890 deaths